Rory Burke (born 27 April 1994) is an Irish rugby union player. He plays as a prop and previously represented Cork Constitution, Munster and Nottingham and Connacht.

Cork Constitution
Having been educated at Christian Brothers College, Cork, Burke began playing for Cork Constitution in the Ulster Bank All-Ireland League and was part of the Con team that won the 2014 Bateman Cup.

Professional career

Munster
On 29 April 2017, Burke made his competitive debut for Munster when he came off the bench to replace Stephen Archer in the provinces 14–34 away victory against Treviso in Round 21 of the 2016–17 Pro12 season.

Nottingham
On 16 May 2017, it was announced that Burke had joined English RFU Championship side Nottingham R.F.C. on a one-year deal, which commenced during the pre-season of the 2017–18 season.

Connacht
Burke returned to Ireland to join Connacht ahead of the 2019–20 season, in a move announced in May 2019. He was released by Connacht in June 2020.

References

External links
Munster Profile
U20 Six Nations Profile

1994 births
Living people
Rugby union players from Cork (city)
Irish rugby union players
Cork Constitution players
Munster Rugby players
Nottingham R.F.C. players
Connacht Rugby players
Rugby union props